Hinchley Wood School is a secondary school with academy status in Hinchley Wood, Surrey, England.

Overview
Hinchley Wood School admits pupils from the age of eleven to between sixteen and eighteen. The school has a Sixth Form which provides a total of 20 AS level/A level subjects: one year and two year non-workplace courses respectively.

Next to the grounds is Hinchley Wood Primary School, one of the three main contributing schools, the other equal status partnership schools being Long Ditton St Mary's Junior School and Thames Ditton Junior School.  A lesser partner is Claygate Primary School as currently preference affecting half of Claygate applies foremost: a roughly eastern division, which is subject to removal under pending proposals to rely more on certain Claygate feeder schools as the secondary feeder schools.  Regard is also had a to a geographical catchment based on homes.

Music performance specialisation
Hinchley Wood School has Music College specialism. Government statutory reports on the school praise its jazz band: Banda di Jazz and samba band which hold regular concerts, and overall variety of music taught and equipment.

Sustainability technology
The school's Sustainability Group supports for instance its Green Flag Award balancing trees, grass, wildlife, hardstanding/buildings and outdoor sports. Allowing for reduction in fossil fuel use and in daytime energy costs, the school has a large array of photovoltaic cells which also lowers carbon dioxide emissions.

History
Kingston Day Commercial School and the Hinchley Wood Central County Council School are its predecessors on the existing site, which merged in 1947.

The Central Council School opened on 4 March 1940 with 360 children drawn exclusively from five schools in Thames Ditton, Claygate and Long Ditton; there was no primary school in Hinchley Wood until after the war, which in itself was a breakaway area as was Claygate, from Thames Ditton.  The students were aged 10 – 14 years reflecting the statutory minimum leaving age at that time and the school had nine forms of 40 children each.

In 1996 after an absence of many decades the school successfully bid for funds (based on local need and teaching experience) with Surrey County Council to resume education in a sixth form.

Specialist needs
The school has a lower degree of speech, Language and Communications Needs ('SCLN') and SEN children than nearby schools. Children who struggle in these area receive extra support wherever achievable within the school's financial constraints and it is natural that these children are totally integrated into all aspects of the school community.

In 2012, 3.6% of pupils were supported by school action plus or with a statement of SEN, compared with the national average of 8.1%, an decrease of 0.4% on the previous year. The school was in the news in 2021 due to a disability discrimination case where the school was accused of unfair treatment towards a student with autism spectrum disorder (ASD).

Educational equipment and spaces

Academic
The classrooms and specialist facilities such as the technology and food rooms incorporate technology in teaching spaces to emulate that used in leading employers' workplaces and/or further education.  All halls and rooms are purpose-built for the size of the school and their intended use.

Music and performance
The school has regular concerts. The sixth form take the main role in arranging their own local and West End theatre trips and it has a dedicated stage for stage productions.

Sports
Clubs and sessions within the timetable are allocated for fitness an wellbeing, organised sport and the study of physical education
Football, rugby and cricket pitches
Netball pitch
Games halls and courts
2010s completed fully equipped gym and sports hall.

Assessment
The school was judged Outstanding in 2013 and achieved this in the context of a reformed and more critical inspection regime.

Depending on which of the main three subjects is analysed, results in 2012 were from the top to the 2nd quintile (five equal groups) nationally as one was in the second highest quintile.  Overall results were in the top quintile.

Notable alumni
Gemma Bissix, actress
Nik Tzanev, footballer for AFC Wimbledon
Theo Randall, chef
David Wiffen, singer-songwriter
Richard Pennycook, retail industry leader, CEO of Co-op Group
Edward Woodward, actor
Michael Cox, football writer
B S Johnson, writer

Notes and references
Notes 
  
References

External links 
Hinchley Wood School website

Borough of Elmbridge
Secondary schools in Surrey
Academies in Surrey